Phusnu Pullawi (Aymara phusnu chyme, pulla a kind of sheep, -wi a suffix, "a place with the chyme of sheep", also spelled Pusnupullave) is a mountain in the north of the Barroso mountain range in the Andes of Peru which reaches a height of approximately . It is located in the Tacna Region, Tarata Province, Tarata District. Phusnu Pullawi lies southwest of Ch'uxñuma and northwest of Chunta Qullu and Pä Qullu.

References 

Mountains of Tacna Region
Mountains of Peru